Mammillaria bombycina, the silken pincushion cactus, is a species of flowering plant in the family Cactaceae.

It is native to Jalisco and Aguascalientes states, in western central Mexico. Because of illegal collecting, the wild population is considered to have a vulnerable status.

The bulbous tubercles, surrounded by downy white hairs, have short white spines and much longer brown curved spines. Circular clusters of deep pink flowers are borne on the upper surface in spring and summer.

Cultivation
Mammillaria bombycina is one of many Mamillaria species to be cultivated, and is among the easiest. In temperate regions it must be grown under glass with heat, preferably in full sun. It has gained the Royal Horticultural Society's Award of Garden Merit.  The plant can be grown from seeds which are collected from the ripe fruits.

References

bombycina
Cacti of Mexico
Endemic flora of Mexico
Flora of Jalisco
Flora of Aguascalientes